The IPWA Heavyweight Championship was a professional wrestling heavyweight championship in the Independent Professional Wrestling Alliance (IPWA). The inaugural champion was Cueball Carmichael, who defeated Justin St. John following a battle royal on October 9, 1995 to become the first IPWA Heavyweight Champion.

There were 10 officially recognized champions with both Carmichael and Tom Brandi winning the title a record 4-times. At 255 days, Big Slam Vader was the longest reigning champion in the title's history. A number of top independent stars held the title during its near 6-year history including Lance Diamond, "Wiseguy" Jimmy Cicero, and "Nature Boy" Buddy Landel.

Title history

Names

Reigns

List of combined reigns

Explanatory footnotes

References

External links
 Official website

Heavyweight wrestling championships